The Elphinstone Inlet, or Khor ash Sham, is a inlet in the Musandam Peninsula of Oman. It was named for the-then Governor of Bombay, Mounstuart Elphinstone, by the British survey team that mapped it in 1820.

History 
The population of the Musandam Peninsular, also known as the Ruus Al Jibal, has long been dominated by the Shihuh and a number of affiliated tribes (such as the Habus and Tunaij) and is mainly today covered by the Omani Musandam Governorate.

Historically, the territory was considered Qawasim but the independently-minded Shihuh were difficult to govern and their principal northern villages were often secessionist, depending on the inaccessibility of the terrain they inhabited. The Shihuh were frequently in conflict with the Al Qasimi of both Sharjah and Ras Al Khaimah and were more ready to accept the Suzerainty of Muscat, leading the Musandam to be generally recognised as Omani territory by the early C20th.

Survey 
The British Nautical Survey of the southeast Arabian coast was mounted in 1820, following the 1819 punitive expedition mounted against the Qawasim by the British East India Company supported by the Royal Navy that led to the General Maritime Treaty of 1820 signed between the British and a number of what would become known as the Trucial States (today the United Arab Emirates). The survey was commissioned by the Governor of Bombay, Mounstuart Elphinstone. Following a long diplomatic career, in 1819, Elphinstone was appointed Lieutenant-Governor of Bombay, and remained in this post until 1827, when he retired to England.

The survey's principal aim was to reconnoitre the coast of the Trucial States, Oman and the islands of the Straits of Hormuz to aid navigation for British shipping in the area, but also to discover hiding places used by the Qawasim and other maritime forces that had long been harrying Omani and other native shipping. While British chroniclers at the time frequently referred to these raids as acts of maritime piracy (and used the phrase 'Pirate Coast' to describe the area), contemporary historians point to these raids forming an element of the state of war existing between the Qawasim and the Sultan of Muscat, Said bin Sultan Al Busaidi. Allied to Muscat, the British were to find themselves caught between the two regional forces.

Geography 
The inlet is some 16 kilometres (9.9 miles) long and surrounded by cliffs 1,000 to 1,250 m (3,280 to 4,100 ft) high. Although stories told locally of sailors diving into the sea to collect fresh water in leather bags have been ascribed to the unique geology of the area, undersea springs are common throughout the coast, fed by aquifers from the mountains.

The entrance to the Inlet is under one kilometre wide and difficult to detect from seaward, making it an ideal hiding place for local sailors in the early C19th, evading their British pursuers who "saw with amazement the enemy suddenly disappearing from the scene as if by magic". Beyond the entrance is the village of Sham and a large island bearing the same name.

The Elphinstone Group is a grouping of five rock outcrops, predominantly limestone and sandstone with occasional dolomite, identified by geologists working for the Iraq Petroleum Group in 1959, three of which are designated within the Ghalilah formation.

Telegraph station 

Telegraph Island, known locally in Arabic as Jazirat Al Maqlab, is located in the Elphinstone Inlet, under 400 meters off the shore of the Musandam Peninsula, and 500 meters south of Sham Island. The island was the location of a telegraph repeater station between 1864 and 1868, built by the British government's Indo-European Telegraph Department in 1862 under an agreement with the Sultan of Muscat at the time, Thuwaini bin Said. The decision to use Musandam as the location of the repeater followed a breakdown of negotiations with the Persian government and it was decided to run the cable from Bahrain to Musandam and onwards to Gwadar, at the time also a dependency of Muscat.

According to British accounts of laying the cable into the Elphinstone Inlet to Telegraph Island, "The aspect of the place accorded well with the known character of its inhabitants, who are wild and savage in the extreme." 

The cable was relocated to run to Hengham Island in 1868. The island continued to be manned by resident British soldiers following its abandonment as a telegraph station, until 1873.

References 

Bodies of water of Oman
History of Oman
History of the United Arab Emirates
Musandam Governorate
Bodies of water of the Persian Gulf